The National Public School, Indiranagar (NPS) is a private school located in Indiranagar, Bangalore, India. It is a sister institution of the National Public School Rajajinagar and National Public School HSR. It was started in 1982 by Dr. Gopalkrishna, chairman of the National education trust.

About

The school is an English medium co-educational school which was affiliated to the Central Board of Secondary Education (CBSE) till 2016, government of India and follows the 10+2 educational pattern.

Achievements
The school has constantly been among the top 10 schools not only in Bangalore, but in the entire country, as per media surveys. In 2012, the school was ranked 8th in India and 2nd in Bangalore.

Notable alumni
Sandeepa Dhar, Bollywood actress and model
Megha, playback singer and neurolinguist

References

External links

Official website
A trophy and a visit to NASA, The Hindu, 20 Nov 2006

High schools and secondary schools in Bangalore
2011 establishments in Karnataka
Educational institutions established in 2011
Private schools in Bangalore